A U.S. National Marine Sanctuary is a zone within United States waters where the marine environment enjoys special protection. The program began in 1972 in response to public concern about the plight of marine ecosystems.

A U.S. National Marine Sanctuary is a federally designated area within United States waters that protects areas of the marine environment with special conservation, recreational, ecological, historical, cultural, archeological, scientific, educational, or aesthetic qualities.

The Office of National Marine Sanctuaries (ONMS), a division of the National Oceanic and Atmospheric Administration (NOAA), administers the 15 national marine sanctuaries.  The program began after the 1969 Santa Barbara oil spill off the coast of California brought the plight of marine ecosystems to national attention. The United States Congress responded in 1972 with the Marine Protection, Research and Sanctuaries Act which allowed for the creation of marine sanctuaries.  The resources protected by U.S. national marine sanctuaries range from coral reef ecosystems in American Samoa, Florida, Hawaii, and Texas, to shipwrecks in the Great Lakes and the Atlantic Ocean.  The Papahānaumokuākea Marine National Monument, while not a U.S. national marine sanctuary, is also jointly administered by the NMSP, in conjunction with the U.S. Fish and Wildlife Service and the State of Hawaii.

Scope of protection

Designation as a National Marine Sanctuary does not automatically prohibit fishing and other activities.  Recreational and commercial fishing is allowed in some sanctuaries.  It is possible to restrict consumptive or destructive activities through the initial designation process  and NMSP actions. There are restrictions in some sanctuaries that are enforced by other governing agencies. For example, current regulations restricting fishing in Stellwagen Bank were not issued by the NMSP, but rather by NOAA Fisheries and the New England Fishery Management Council, which have jurisdiction in federal waters off the New England coast generally.  The private non-profit Marine Conservation Institute has compiled fact sheets for each sanctuary listing activities which are directly regulated by the NMSP.

Designating Sanctuary Sites 
Site selection is done under the auspices of the National Oceanic and Atmospheric Administration (NOAA). Regional teams of marine scientists identify geographically representative sites for potential marine sanctuaries. NOAA then selects candidate sites and meets with state resource managers and/or the governor's staff to determine the interest level. If there is mutually satisfactory interest, the candidate sites are evaluated through a process of public and legislative review and validated by congressional, state, and territorial governments. NOAA initiates the designation by the preparation of a Draft Environmental Impact Statement (DEIS) and a proposed management plan. Notice is published in the Federal Register. Regional meetings and public hearings are held to gather comments. Congress receives the draft statements and may conduct hearings. A Final Environmental Impact Statement (FEIS) that addresses the concerns raised in the DEIS process is prepared and distributed for comment. The Secretary of Commerce, upon approval of the US President, designates the area as a National Marine Sanctuary. The US Congress and the governor of the state or territory may formally object to or appeal against the designation.

List of U.S. National Marine Sanctuaries

Channel Islands National Marine Sanctuary (Pacific)
Cordell Bank National Marine Sanctuary (Pacific)
National Marine Sanctuary of American Samoa (formerly Fagatele Bay) (Pacific)
Florida Keys National Marine Sanctuary (Atlantic, Gulf of Mexico)
Flower Garden Banks National Marine Sanctuary (Gulf of Mexico)
Gray's Reef National Marine Sanctuary (Atlantic)
Greater Farallones National Marine Sanctuary (formerly Gulf of the Farallones) (Pacific)
Hawaiian Islands Humpback Whale National Marine Sanctuary (Pacific)
Mallows Bay National Marine Sanctuary (Atlantic)
Monitor National Marine Sanctuary (Atlantic)
Monterey Bay National Marine Sanctuary (Pacific)
Olympic Coast National Marine Sanctuary (Pacific)
Stellwagen Bank National Marine Sanctuary (Atlantic)
Thunder Bay National Marine Sanctuary (Great Lakes)
Wisconsin Shipwreck Coast National Marine Sanctuary (Great Lakes)

Proposed
Lake Ontario National Marine Sanctuary (Great Lakes)
Chumash Heritage National Marine Sanctuary (Pacific)

Notes

External links
Sanctuaries.noaa.gov:  Official National Marine Sanctuaries website

National Oceanic and Atmospheric Administration
Marine Sanctuary
Coasts of the United States
Marine Sanctuary